Daniel Holloway may refer to:

 Daniel Holloway (admiral), U.S. Navy admiral
 Daniel Holloway (cyclist) (born 1987), American cyclist